European Liberal Youth (abbreviated as LYMEC) is an international organisation of liberal youth movements – mostly the youth wings of members of the Alliance of Liberals and Democrats for Europe Party but also individual members.

LYMEC holds full members status to the European Youth Forum (YFJ). It is the official youth wing of the Alliance of Liberals and Democrats for Europe (ALDE) Party and holds separate votes in the statutory bodies of the ALDE Party.

Even though the organisation is now called European Liberal Youth, it is still known as LYMEC, which is the abbreviation of the name when the organisation was formed in 1976. It was then known as Liberal and Radical Youth Movement of the European Communities.

Member organisations

Positions 
In 2020, LYMEC adopted a resolution, according to which the organisations call for recognition of Taiwan as an independent country. The initiative was submitted by the Danish member organisation Radikal Ungdom.

See also 
International Federation of Liberal Youth
ALDE Party
Young Democrats for Europe

References

External links

International liberal organizations
Liberal Youth, European
Youth empowerment organizations
Alliance of Liberals and Democrats for Europe Party